Ron Lynch (born 12 June 1939) is an Australian former professional rugby league footballer who played in the 1960s and 1970s. An Australian international and New South Wales interstate representative forward, he played club football in NSW for Young, Forbes, Parramatta and Penrith.

Playing career

Young
Lynch started his playing career in the town of his birth, Young, where he played Maher Cup.

Forbes
He moved to Forbes for work where he gained selection in the Country NSW and New South Wales sides in 1960.

Parramatta
He then moved to Sydney for the 1961 NSWRFL season, playing for the Parramatta club after they paid a £700 transfer fee. During that season he made his Test debut against the Kiwis in New Zealand. Appointed captain of Parramatta, in 1963 Lynch led his club to victory over the touring South African side. He was selected to go on the 1963–64 Kangaroo tour of Great Britain and France, playing from the interchange bench in the first Test against France.

In 1964 he was the top try-scorer in a combined Sydney side's 49-2 rout of France. Lynch was selected to go on the 1967–68 Kangaroo tour of Great Britain and France. He played in the first and second Ashes series Test matches against Great Britain and in the first and second Test matches against France.

Penrith
Moving to Penrith for the 1972 NSWRFL season, Lynch was appointed captain of the club. He retired at the end of the 1973 season.

Coaching career
In 1970 Lynch was Parramatta's captain-coach. The following season was to be his last for the club.

References

1939 births
Living people
Australia national rugby league team players
Australian rugby league coaches
Australian rugby league players
City New South Wales rugby league team players
Country New South Wales rugby league team players
New South Wales rugby league team players
Parramatta Eels captains
Parramatta Eels coaches
Parramatta Eels players
Penrith Panthers captains
Penrith Panthers players
Rugby league locks
Rugby league second-rows